Vallehermoso is an administrative neighborhood of Madrid belonging to the district of Chamberí. As of 1 February 2020, it has a population of 20,480. The Vallehermoso Stadium, the traditional venue in the city for athletics competitions, is located in the neighborhood. The stadium re-opened in 2019.

References 

Wards of Madrid
Chamberí